Bashira was a popular Arabic-language newspaper published in Fallujah, Iraq.  It was discontinued during the summer of 2006.  The newspaper was replaced by a new newspaper called Al Anbaa.  The name Bashira translates into English as "Good News."

References

2006 disestablishments in Iraq
Arabic-language newspapers
Defunct newspapers published in Iraq
Mass media in Fallujah
Publications with year of establishment missing
Publications disestablished in 2006